Panama is a village in Montgomery and Bond counties, Illinois, United States. The population was 337 at the 2020 census.

History
The town was founded in the early 20th century when the Shoal Creek Coal Company of Chicago sank a coal mine shaft there. The shaft was completed in 1906. The town attracted many European immigrants.

Geography
Panama is located at  (39.030451, -89.523548).

Two-thirds of the village is in Montgomery County, with the remainder in Bond County. Local law enforcement is dispatched through the Montgomery County Sheriff's Office in Hillsboro.

Demographics

As of the 2020 census there were 337 people, 111 households, and 59 families residing in the village. The racial makeup of the village was 93.77% White, 0.59% Asian, 1.78% from other races, and 3.86% from two or more races. Hispanic or Latino of any race were 2.08% of the population.

There were 111 households, out of which 32.43% had children under the age of 18 living with them, 39.64% were married couples living together, 10.81% had a female householder with no husband present, and 46.85% were non-families. 35.14% of all households were made up of individuals, and 15.32% had someone living alone who was 65 years of age or older. The average household size was 2.66 and the average family size was 1.99.

The village's age distribution consisted of 18.1% under the age of 18, 5.0% from 18 to 24, 23% from 25 to 44, 28% from 45 to 64, and 25.8% who were 65 years of age or older. The median age was 50.5 years. For every 100 females, there were 87.3 males. For every 100 females age 18 and over, there were 79.2 males.

The median income for a household in the village was $55,114, and the median income for a family was $57,083. Males had a median income of $37,500 versus $25,938 for females. The per capita income for the village was $26,720. About 8.5% of families and 10.4% of the population were below the poverty line, including 10.0% of those under age 18 and 12.3% of those age 65 or over.

Notable person

 John L. Lewis, nationally known union organizer, coal miner in Panama (1909-1915)

References

External links
Historical Society of Montgomery County

Villages in Bond County, Illinois
Villages in Illinois
Villages in Montgomery County, Illinois
Populated places established in 1906
Company towns in Illinois
1906 establishments in Illinois
Coal towns in Illinois